James Davis (known for a period as Duramboi) (1808 – 7 May 1889) was a Scottish-born convict, notable for escaping custody in Australia and living with aboriginals.  He subsequently rejoined European society and became a shopkeeper.

Biography 
Davis was born in Broomielaw, Scotland and was apprenticed for a period at Old Wynd, Glasgow.  In 1824, he was sentenced to transportation to Australia for seven years for stealing 2 shillings 6 pence from a church box in Surrey, arriving in New South Wales in August 1825. In 1828 he was tried for robbery at Patrick's Plains and was sentenced to three years imprisonment at the Moreton Bay penal settlement (now Brisbane, Queensland). Six weeks after his arrival in February 1829,  he escaped with a companion and they soon joined a group of Aboriginals led by Pamby-Pamby. While his companion eventually broke tribal law and was killed, Davis was accepted into the tribe and was known as "Duramboi".  He travelled hundreds of miles from Brisbane and learned the languages and customs of many tribes.

In 1842 he met Andrew Petrie in Wide Bay, who persuaded him to accept that it was safe to return to Brisbane with the cessation of transportation. He relearned English and gradually fitted back into European society. He became a blacksmith at Kangaroo Point and in 1846 he married Annie Shea. In 1864 he established a crockery shop in George Street, Brisbane.  In 1883, soon after his first wife's death, he married one Bridget Hayes.  He occasionally worked as an interpreter for Aboriginals in court and gave some descriptions of Aboriginal rites.  Under his will, he donated £750 in 1889 and £1100 in 1911 to the Brisbane General Hospital.

References

External links
James Davis - Convict Queenslander

1808 births
1889 deaths
Convicts transported to Australia
People from Brisbane
Criminals from Glasgow
Scottish emigrants to colonial Australia